Anil Dalpat Sonavaria (born 20 September 1963) is the first Hindu ever to play Test cricket for Pakistan. After retirement from cricket, he migrated to Canada with his family where he started a business.

Dalpat was a lower-order batsman and wicket keeper, and represented Pakistan for a brief interval in the early 1980s, when Wasim Bari was injured. Dalpat has had a wider first-class cricket experience and career, and is the cousin of Danish Kaneria, Pakistan's first-choice spin bowler and only the second Hindu to play for Pakistan. He lives in the metropolis of Karachi, and is of Rajasthani heritage. The first Hindu to play Test cricket for Pakistan, Anil Dalpat was one of several wicketkeepers given a chance after the retirement of Wasim Bari.

Career
On his debut, against England at Karachi in 1983–84, Dalpat kept well to the spin of Abdul Qadir as Pakistan won by three wickets. In his nine Tests, he made 25 dismissals and a highest score of 52 against New Zealand at Karachi in 1984–85. Dalpat is the first cousin of Danish Kaneria, who made his Test debut for Pakistan in the 2000–01 series against England. In 1983–84 Dalpat dismissed 67 batsmen, a Pakistan domestic record.

References

1963 births
Living people
Pakistan One Day International cricketers
Pakistan Test cricketers
Karachi cricketers
Pakistan International Airlines cricketers
Pakistani Hindus
Pakistani cricketers
Cricketers from Karachi
Pakistan International Airlines B cricketers
Karachi Blues cricketers
Karachi Whites cricketers
Pakistani people of Rajasthani descent
Pakistani emigrants to Canada
Wicket-keepers